Pride Magazine is a magazine targeting Black British, mixed-race, African and African-Caribbean women in the United Kingdom. This lifestyle magazine has been in publication since 1991.

The magazine has a circulation of more than 30,000 copies per month. Pride Magazine is also the only Black media company of any size that remains in Black British ownership alongside the UK record label Dice Recordings. In 2012, the magazine celebrated its 21st year as the market leader. The Guardian newspaper stated back in 2007 that "Pride Magazine has dominated its market for over 15 years."

The magazine switched its format in 2011 as it turned 20 to the popular Glamour-sized format.

References

External links
Official website

1991 establishments in the United Kingdom
Afro-Caribbean culture in London
Monthly magazines published in the United Kingdom
Women's magazines published in the United Kingdom
Caribbean-British culture
Magazines published in London
Magazines established in 1991